The Men's long jump event  at the 2013 European Athletics Indoor Championships was held at March 2, 2013 at 11:00 & 12:30 (qualification) and March 3, 17:00 (final) local time.

Records

Results

Qualification
Qualification: Qualification Performance 8.05 (Q) or at least 8 best performers advanced to the final.

Final
The final was held at 17:00.

References

Long jump at the European Athletics Indoor Championships
2013 European Athletics Indoor Championships